Lady of Vengeance is a 1957 British film noir crime film directed by Burt Balaban and starring Dennis O'Keefe.

Plot
When 21-year-old Melissa Collins (Eileen Elton) commits suicide, her guardian, the domineering American newspaper publisher William T. Marshall (Dennis O'Keefe), searches (in flashback) for a reason. He finds it in a letter he receives from Melissa, after her death. In this, she asks Marshall to take revenge on her lover, philandering musician Larry Shaw (Vernon Greeves), who caused her such pain he made life not worth living. Marshall hires criminal mastermind, Karnak (Anton Diffring), an avid philatelist. He promises him a rare stamp in exchange for planning the torturous murder of Larry Shaw. Meanwhile, Marshall's loyal secretary, Katie Whiteside (Ann Sears), attempts to calm her boss's obsessive desires for vengeance. Matters become additionally complicated however, when Karnak targets the wrong man.

Cast
 Dennis O'Keefe as William T. Marshal 
 Ann Sears as Katie Whiteside 
 Anton Diffring as Emile Karnak
 Patrick Barr as Inspector Madden
 Vernon Greeves as Larry Shaw
 Eileen Elton as Melissa Collins
 Frederick Schiller as Schleigel
 Jacqueline Curtis as Penny
 G. H. Mulcaster as Bennett
 Gerald Case as Hawley
 Jack McNaughton as Coroner 
 Colin Croft as Bartender 
 Andy Ho as Houseman
 Humphrey Morton as Corbey

Critical reception
Dennis Schwartz writing in Ozus' World Movie Reviews, called the film a "tedious noir crime drama about the insanity of revenge"; Leonard Maltin also described the film as "tedious"; and TV Guide noted, "the plot is very confusing, making it hard to follow this picture. Slack direction does little to help."

References

External links
 
 

1957 films
1957 crime drama films
British crime drama films
Film noir
1950s English-language films
British black-and-white films
Films directed by Burt Balaban
1950s British films